The 2005 FIVB Volleyball Boys' U19 World Championship was held in Algiers and Oran, Algeria, from 24 August to 1 September 2005.

Qualification

Venues

Preliminary round 
All times are local (UTC+1).

Pool A 

|}

|}

Pool B 

|}

|}

Pool C 

|}

|}

Pool D 

|}

|}

Final round

Pool E - Play-off (Seeding Group) 

|}

Pool F - Play-off (Elimination Group) 

|}

Championship bracket

5th–8th places bracket

Quarterfinals 

|}

5th–8th semifinals 

|}

Semifinals 

|}

7th place 

|}

5th place 

|}

Third place 

|}

Final 

|}

Final standing 
Final Standings results are given below.

Team Roster
Maxim Mikhaylov, Dmitry Ilinikh, Dmitry Krasikov, Anton Fomenko, Makar Saparov, Oleg Sychev, Konstantin Lesik, Alexander Chefranov, Roman Martynyuk, Nikolay Evtyukhin, Sergey Bagrey, Sergey Andrianov
Head Coach: Vladimir Kondra

Awards 

 Most Valuable Player
  Anton Fomenko
 Best Top Scorer
  Nicolas Maréchal
 Best Spiker
  Mohammad Mousavi

 Best Blocker
  Deivid Costa
 Best Server
  Konstantin Lesik

 Best Digger
  Roman Martynyuk
 Best Setter
  Juraj Zatko

References

External links 
 2005 Youth Boys' Under 19 World Championship - Algiers & Oran - FIVB

FIVB Volleyball Boys' U19 World Championship
World Youth Championship
International volleyball competitions hosted by Algeria
2005 in Algerian sport
Sport in Oran
Sport in Algiers